Compsoctena microctenis is a moth in the family Eriocottidae. It was described by Edward Meyrick in 1914. It is found in South Africa, Tanzania and Zimbabwe.

The wingspan is about 24 mm. The forewings are pale ochreous, with some scattered undefined strigulae of brownish and black specks, especially in the disc and on the anterior portion of the costa. The hindwings are grey.

References

Moths described in 1914
Compsoctena
Lepidoptera of South Africa
Lepidoptera of Tanzania
Insects of Zimbabwe